Nepicastat (INN, codenamed SYN117, RS-25560-197) is an inhibitor of dopamine beta-hydroxylase, an enzyme that catalyzes the conversion of dopamine to norepinephrine.

It has been studied as a possible treatment for congestive heart failure, and appears to be well tolerated as such. As of 2012, clinical trials to assess nepicastat as a treatment for post-traumatic stress disorder (PTSD) and cocaine dependence have been completed. In Phase 2 study treatment with nepicastat was not effective in relieving PTSD-associated symptoms when compared to placebo. The study was funded by the U.S. Department of Defense.

References

Aminotetralins
Imidazolines
Fluoroarenes
Thioureas
Dopamine beta hydroxylase inhibitors